High Park is a suburb of Southport, Merseyside, England. It is located on the eastern fringe on the town, just south of Churchtown. High Park Road is within the area of Sefton Metropolitan Borough Council Council who provide services such as refuse collection and are responsible for the collection of council tax.

References

Southport